Eriozona is a genus of hoverflies in the subfamily Syrphinae.

Species
 Eriozona analis  (Kertész, 1901) 
Eriozona nigroscutellata (Shiraki, 1930)
Eriozona syrphoides (Fallén, 1817)
Eriozona tricolorata (Huo, Ren & Zheng, 2007)

References

Diptera of Europe
Hoverfly genera
Syrphinae
Taxa named by Ignaz Rudolph Schiner